Paul Joseph Sait (born 4 September 1947) is a former Australian rugby league footballer and coach. A versatile  or running forward who played in the 1960s and 1970s for South Sydney. He made 7 Test appearances for the Australian national representative side and represented in 9 World Cup matches in two World Cups and in 10 Kangaroo tour matches.

Club career
He featured in the talented South Sydney sides of the early seventies. He played in the 1969 Grand Final loss to Balmain and then in the Premiership victories of 1970 and 1971.

He played 221 club games for South Sydney between 1969 and 1979 with 163 of those games in 1st Grade. He scored 44 tries for the club.

In 2004 he was named by Souths in their South Sydney Dream Team, consisting of 17 players and a coach representing the club from 1908 through to 2004.

Representative career
He debuted for Australia in the centres in the 1970 World Cup in Britain though the remainder of his representative career was played at second-row forward. 
His first Test appearance was on the 1971 tour of New Zealand. He played in the 1972 World Cup in France and toured Great Britain with the Kangaroos in 1973 playing in four Tests and nine tour matches. He played lock on the 1973 tour of England and France including all the tests. Sait is listed on the Australian Players Register as Kangaroo No. 451.

Coaching
Sait went on to coach at Souths in the 1980s.

Footnotes

Sources
 Andrews, Malcolm (2006) The ABC of Rugby League, Austn Broadcasting Corpn, Sydney

People educated at Matraville Sports High School
Australian rugby league players
South Sydney Rabbitohs players
Australia national rugby league team players
Australian rugby league coaches
South Sydney Rabbitohs coaches
Living people
Rugby league centres
New South Wales rugby league team players
City New South Wales rugby league team players
South Sydney Rabbitohs captains
1947 births